is a Japanese actor, voice actor and narrator. As a child, he was a member of Gekidan Himawari, a children's acting troupe. He is currently employed by the talent management firm Aoni Production.

Furuya is most known for the anime roles of Amuro Ray (Gundam), Hyūma Hoshi (Star of the Giants), Pegasus Seiya (Saint Seiya), Yamcha (Dragon Ball), Kyōsuke Kasuga (Kimagure Orange Road) and Tuxedo Mask (Sailor Moon). He considers these roles as his most important roles. He also voiced Mario in several anime and commercials, starting with the film Super Mario Bros.: The Great Mission to Rescue Princess Peach! (1986).

He also used a pseudonym  in the cast of Mobile Suit Gundam 00 for Ribbons Almark's role (but used his real name in the narration role). Both the narration role and Ribbons Almark were Furuya's first role in a non-Universal Century Gundam series. He is also the best known official dubbing voice for Hong Kong action film actor, Yuen Biao.

On January 2, 2017, Tsukino-Con announced that he would to be featured as acting guest on Tsukino-Con 2017.

Personal life
He married voice actress Mami Koyama in 1976; they later divorced in 1983. He remarried Satomi Najima in 1985.

Filmography

Television animation
1960s
Kaizoku Ōji (1966), Kid
Star of the Giants (1968), Hyūma Hoshi
1970s
Steel Jeeg (1975), Hiroshi Shiba
Groizer X (1976), Jō Umisaka
Hyōga Senshi Gaisragger (1977), Ken Shiki
Yakyūkyō no Uta (1977), Yamai
Gordian Warrior (1979), Ryōma Okamoto
Mobile Suit Gundam (1979), Amuro Ray
Space Battleship Yamato III (1979), Tasuke Tokugawa
Space Carrier Blue Noah (1979), Shin Himoto
1980s
Maeterlinck's Blue Bird: Tyltyl and Mytyl's Adventurous Journey (1980), Tyltyl
Marine Snow no Densetsu (1980), Hiro Umino
Queen Millennia (1981), Daisuke Yomori
The Swiss Family Robinson: Flone of the Mysterious Island (1981), Franz Robinson
Akūdai Taisakusen Scramble (1983), Jet
Nanako SOS (1983), Shūichi Iidabashi
Nine (1983), Katsuya Niimi
Plawres Sanshiro (1983), Shingu Narita
Special Armored Battalion Dorvack (1983), Masato Mugen
Stop!! Hibari-kun! (1983), Kōsaku Sakamoto
Katri, Girl of the Meadows (1984), Martti
Twin Hawks (1984), Taka Sawatari
Video Warrior Laserion (1984), Takashi Katori
Mobile Suit Zeta Gundam (1985), Amuro Ray
Urusei Yatsura (1985), Shingo Oniwaban and Tobimaro Mizukonoji
Dragon Ball (1986), Yamcha, Kogamera
Highschool! Kimen-gumi (1986), Harumage Don 
Saint Seiya (1986), Pegasus Seiya
Kimagure Orange Road (1987), Kyōsuke Kasuga
Dragon Ball Z (1989), Yamcha, Saibaiman
Dragon Quest (1989), Abel
1990s
Kyatto Ninden Teyandee (1990), Puma Pochi 
21-emon (1991), Wantonaku Kōshaku
Cooking Papa (1992), Toshio Nekkota
Sailor Moon (1992), Mamoru Chiba/Tuxedo Mask/King Endymion
Marmalade Boy (1994), Shinichi Namura
Dr. Slump (1997), Suppaman
Dragon Ball GT (1997), Puck
The Big O (1999), Bonnie Fraser
Detective Conan (1996), Hiroshi Akimoto/Tohru Amuro/Bourbon/Rei Furuya
GTO (1999), Suguru Teshigawara
2000s
Detective School Q (2003), Hitoshi Shinoda
Akagi (2005), Narration
Black Jack (2005), Dr. Daigo Ōedo
Ultimate Girls (2005), UFOman
Mobile Suit Gundam 00 (2007), Narration, Ribbons Almark
Casshern Sins (2008), Casshern
Mōryō no Hako (2008), Mysterious Man (Shunkō Kubo)
Dragon Ball Kai (2009), Yamcha
Kūchū Buranko (2009), Hideo Tsuda

2010s
Inuyasha: The Final Act (2010), Shikon no Tama
Pocket Monsters: Best Wishes! (2011), Burgh
Un-Go (2011), Jirou Shimada
Gintama (2011), General Eren/Elizabeth
Saint Seiya Omega (2012), Sagittarius Seiya, Narration
Dragon Ball Kai Majin Boo Saga (2014), Yamcha
Mobile Suit Gundam-san (2014), Narration
One Piece (2014), Sabo
Dragon Ball Super (2015), Yamcha
2020s
D4DJ First Mix (2020), Ryūjin Kofune
Detective Conan: Police Academy Arc (2021), Rei Furuya
Birdie Wing: Golf Girls' Story (2022), Reiya Amuro
Detective Conan: Zero's Tea Time (2022), Rei Furuya/Tōru Amuro

Anime films
Star of the Giants series (1969–1982), Hyōma Hoshi
Be Forever Yamato (1980), Tasuke Tokugawa
Toward the Terra (1980), Tony
Mobile Suit Gundam (1981), Amuro Ray
Mobile Suit Gundam: Soldiers of Sorrow (1981), Amuro Ray
The Legend of Sirius (1981), Sirius
Mobile Suit Gundam: Encounters in Space (1982), Amuro Ray
Queen Millennia (1982), Daisuke Yomori
Final Yamato (1983), Tasuke Tokugawa
Genma Taisen (1983), Jō Azuma
Nine (1983), Katsuya Niimi
Windaria (1986), Izu
Dragon Ball series (1986–88), Yamcha
Super Mario Bros.: The Great Mission to Rescue Princess Peach! (1986), Mario
11 Piki no Neko to Ahōdori (1986), Toraneko Taishō
Saint Elmo – Hikari no Raihousha (1987), Issei Yūki
Saint Seiya series (1987–2012), Pegasus Seiya
Mobile Suit Gundam: Char's Counterattack (1988), Amuro Ray
Dragon Ball Z series (1990–), Yamcha
Ultraman: The Adventure Begins (1989), Scott Masterson/Ultraman Scott
Kim's Cross (1990), Kim Jae-Ha
Sailor Moon series (1993–2001), Mamoru Chiba
Lupin III: Dead or Alive (1996), Panishu
Pocket Monsters the Movie: Mewtwo Strikes Back (1998), Sorao
Mobile Suit Zeta Gundam: A New Translation - Heirs to the Stars (2005), Amuro Ray
Mobile Suit Zeta Gundam: A New Translation II - Lovers (2005), Amuro Ray
Mobile Suit Zeta Gundam: A New Translation III - Love is the Pulse of the Stars (2006), Amuro Ray
Detective Conan: The Private Eyes' Requiem (2006), Ito Suehiko
Paprika (2006), Dr. Kosaku Tokita
Space Battleship Yamato: Resurrection (2009), Tasuke Tokugawa
Bleach: Hell Verse (2010), Shuren
Mobile Suit Gundam 00 The Movie: A wakening of the Trailblazer (2010), E.A. Ray
Expelled from Paradise (2014), Alonzo Percy
Sekai-ichi Hatsukoi: Yokozawa Takafumi no Baai (2014), Zen Kirishima
One Piece Film: Gold (2016), Sabo
Detective Conan: The Darkest Nightmare (2016), Rei Furuya/Tōru Amuro
Eureka Seven: Hi-Evolution 1 (2017), Adrock Thurston
Detective Conan: Zero the Enforcer (2018), Rei Furuya/Tōru Amuro
Even if the World Will End Tomorrow (2019), narrator
The Legend of the Galactic Heroes: Die Neue These Seiran (2019), Freiherr Flegel
The Journey (2021), Aus
Mobile Suit Gundam: Hathaway (2021), Amuro Ray
Detective Conan: The Bride of Halloween (2022), Rei Furuya/Tōru Amuro
Mobile Suit Gundam: Cucuruz Doan's Island (2022), Amuro Ray

Original video animation (OVA)
Prefectural Earth Defense Force (1986), Hiroaki Narita
One-pound Gospel (1988), Kosaku Hatanaka
Kimagure Orange Road (1989), Kyōsuke Kasuga
Legend of the Galactic Heroes (1989), Andrew Fork
Amada Anime Series: Super Mario Bros. (1989), Mario
Urusei Yatsura: The Electric Household Guard (1989), Shingo Oniwaban
Utsunomiko (1990), Utsunomiko
Kyōfu Shinbun (1991), Rei Onigata
Kyūkyoku Chōjin R (1991), Tsuyoshi
Super Mario World: Mario to Yoshi no Bōken Land (1991), Mario
Macross II (1992), Feff
Black Jack (1995), Leslie
Arcade Gamer Fubuki (2002), Mysterious Person
Saint Seiya: Hades — Chapter Sanctuary (2002), Pegasus Seiya
Mobile Suit Gundam Unicorn: Episode 7: Over the Rainbow (2014), Amuro Ray
Mobile Suit Gundam: The Origin (2015), Amuro Ray

Original net animation (ONA)
Baki (2018–20), Narrator
Baki Hanma (2021), Narrator

Video games
Super Robot Wars series, Amuro Ray, Hiroshi Shiba, Ribbons Almark, Mr. Zone
SD Gundam G Generation series, Amuro Ray, Ribbons Almark
Super Dodge Ball (1994), Kenji
Overdrivin' DX (1996), vehicle commentary narration
BS Super Mario USA Power Challenge (1996), Mario
Excitebike: Bun Bun Mario Battle Stadium (1997), Mario
BS Super Mario Collection (1997), Mario
Cyberbots: Full Metal Madness (1997), Jin Saotome
Sega Rally 2 (1998), narration
Menkyo wo Torō! (2000), Yūichi Amano
Kessen II (2001), Liu Bei
Mobile Suit Gundam: Federation vs. Zeon (2001), Amuro Ray
Mobile Suit Gundam Z: AEUG vs. Titans (2003), Amuro Ray
Mobile Suit Gundam: Gundam vs. Zeta Gundam (2004), Amuro Ray
Another Century's Episode (2005), Amuro Ray
Ninety-Nine Nights (2006), Dwingvatt
Ski Jumping Pairs: Reloaded (2006)
Dragon Shadow Spell (2007), Suihi
Dynasty Warriors: Gundam series, Amuro Ray, Ribbons Almark
Sands of Destruction (2008), Taupy Toplan
Mobile Suit Gundam: Gundam vs. Gundam (2008), Amuro Ray
Mobile Suit Gundam: Gundam vs. Gundam Next (2009), Amuro Ray, Ribbons Almark
Kamen Rider: Climax Heroes (2009), theme song performer
Mobile Suit Gundam: Extreme Vs. (2010), Amuro Ray
Saint Seiya Omega Ultimate Cosmo (2012), Pegasus Seiya
Mobile Suit Gundam: Extreme Vs. Full Boost (2014), Amuro Ray, Ribbons Almark
Xenoblade Chronicles 2 (2017), Godfrey
SD Gundam Battle Alliance (2022), Amuro Ray

Live action
Tokyo Defense Command: The Guardman, episode 90, ransom delivery boy

Tokusatsu
UFO Daisensou: Tatakae! Red Tiger Episodes 1-4, voice of Red Tiger
GoGo Sentai Boukenger vs. Super Sentai, voice of Aka Red/Gao Red/Magi Red
Kaizoku Sentai Gokaiger, voice of Aka Red
Unofficial Sentai Akibaranger Season Tsuu Episode 12, voice of unofficial Giant God Prism Ace

Radio drama
Nissan A, Abe Reiji ~ beyond the average ~, Reiji Amuro

Dubbing roles

Live-action
Yuen Biao
The Young Master (2014 Blu-ray edition), Sang Kung's son / Fourth Brother
Project A (2011 Wowow edition), Inspector Hong Tin-Tsu
Zu Warriors from the Magic Mountain (1992 TBS edition), Di Ming Qi / Dik Ming Kei
Wheels on Meals, David
Millionaires Express, Fire Chief Tsao Cheuk Kin
Mr. Vampire II, Yen
Dragons Forever, Tung Te-Biao / Timothy
Licence to Steal, Swordsman
Kickboxer, Lau Zhai
The Hero of Swallow, Li San
The Seven Heroes of Shaolin
Enter the Phoenix, Georgie Hung's father
Rob-B-Hood, Inspector Steve Mok
Tai Chi Hero, Li Qiankun
The Bodyguard, Cop
Bull, Benjamin "Benny" Colón (Freddy Rodriguez)
Casablanca (New Era Movies edition), Victor Laszlo (Paul Henreid)
Couple or Trouble, Billy Park (Kim Sung-min)
Disciples of the 36th Chamber, Fong Sai-Yuk (Hsiao Ho)
The Goonies (1988 TBS edition), Brandon "Brand" Walsh (Josh Brolin)
The Hunter (1982 Fuji TV edition), Tommy Price (LeVar Burton)
The Karate Kid Part II, Daniel LaRusso (Ralph Macchio)
Memphis Belle, Richard "Rascal" Moore (Sean Astin)
Method Man, Shao Lung (Peter Chen Lau)
My Darling Clementine (1969 TV Asashi edition), James Earp (Don Garner)
Pacific Rim, Dr. Newton Geiszler (Charlie Day)
Pacific Rim Uprising, Dr. Newton Geiszler (Charlie Day)
Rio Bravo (1973 TV Asashi edition), Colorado Ryan (Ricky Nelson)
Superman (1983 TV Asashi edition), Jimmy Olsen (Marc McClure)
Superman II (1984 TV Asashi edition), Jimmy Olsen (Marc McClure)
Superman III (1985 TV Asashi edition), Jimmy Olsen (Marc McClure)
West Side Story (1979 TBS edition), Action (Tony Mordente)

Animation
Sinbad Jr. and his Magic Belt, Sinbad Jr.
Muppet Babies, Scooter
Emergency +4, Keith
SpongeBob SquarePants series, (Squidward Tentacles, Season 9, Little Yellow Book)

Awards

References

External links

  
  

 Tōru Furuya at GamePlaza-Haruka Voice Acting Database 
 Tōru Furuya at Hitoshi Doi's Seiyuu Database
 

1953 births
Living people
Aoni Production voice actors
Japanese male child actors
Japanese male video game actors
Japanese male voice actors
Male voice actors from Yokohama
Meiji University alumni
Seiyu Award winners
Tokyo Actor's Consumer's Cooperative Society voice actors
20th-century Japanese male actors
21st-century Japanese male actors